Dave Shelton is a retired American soccer player who played four seasons in the North American Soccer League.

Shelton attended the Indiana University where he played on the men's soccer team from 1975 to 1977.  He was the 1976 NCAA Most Outstanding Defensive Player as the Hoosiers finished runner-up in the NCAA Men's Division I Soccer Championship.  In 1977, he was selected as an Honorable Mention All American.

In 1978, Shelton turned professional when the Detroit Express of the North American Soccer League picked him second overall in the draft.  In 1979, he moved to the Los Angeles Aztecs where he played three outdoor and two indoor seasons.

References

External links
 NASL stats

1956 births
Living people
American soccer players
Detroit Express players
Indiana Hoosiers men's soccer players
Los Angeles Aztecs players
North American Soccer League (1968–1984) indoor players
North American Soccer League (1968–1984) players
Association football midfielders
Association football defenders